The Cornwall Motor Speedway is a 1/4 mile dirt track near the community of Cornwall, Ontario, Canada. It is located northwest of the city on Cornwall Centre Road. The track opened in 1970 and runs weekly racing on Sunday evenings.

Weekly race classes include modified, sportsman, pro stock, semi pro and mini stock. Yearly special event shows feature the Big Block Modifieds, sprint cars and late models.

Past track champions from each class include:

See also
Dirt track racing
Dirt track racing in Canada

External links
Cornwall Motor Speedway

Motorsport venues in Ontario
Dirt oval racing venues in Canada